İskender (Alexander) Chitaşi (1904-1938) was a Laz linguist, educator, writer, and activist. He was known for creating the first newspaper in the Laz language called "Mçita Murutsxi" (Red Star).

References

20th-century linguists
1904 births
1938 deaths
Turkish people of Laz descent
Laz people
Soviet emigrants to Turkey